1,1,2,2,3,3-Hexachloropropane is a compound of chlorine, hydrogen, and carbon, with structural formula .  Its molecule can be described as that of propane with chlorine atoms substituted for six hydrogen atoms, two on each carbon. It is a liquid at ambient temperature.

References

Chloroalkanes